First Warning (2005) is a science fantasy novel by American writers Anne McCaffrey and Elizabeth Ann Scarborough. It is the first book in the trilogy Acorna's Children, which is part of the Acorna Universe series that McCaffrey and Margaret Ball initiated in Acorna: The Unicorn Girl (1997).

First Warning chronicles the adventures of Khorii. She is the daughter of Acorna and Aari, main characters in the earlier books. It is a coming-of-age story in a sense, and as Khorii ages she learns to use the telepathic powers that are characteristic of all her people, the Linyaari.

References

2005 American novels
2005 fantasy novels
2005 science fiction novels
Novels by Anne McCaffrey
Acorna
Eos Books books